Stant is a surname. Notable people with the surname include:

 Charlotte Stant, character in The Golden Bowl
 David Stant (born 1964), American American football coach
 Phil Stant (born 1962), English football player
 Shane Stant, involved in the 1994 Cobo Arena attack